Charles Delmonte Leonard (August 27, 1912 – May 10, 1952) was an American Negro league first baseman in the 1930s.

A native of Rocky Mount, North Carolina, Leonard was the brother of Baseball Hall of Famer Buck Leonard. He played for the Brooklyn Royal Giants in 1933 and died in Kinston, North Carolina in 1952 at age 39.

References

External links
Baseball statistics and player information from Baseball-Reference Black Baseball Stats and Seamheads

1912 births
1952 deaths
Brooklyn Royal Giants players
Baseball first basemen
Baseball players from North Carolina
Sportspeople from Rocky Mount, North Carolina
20th-century African-American sportspeople